Osvaldo Fabian Grimberg (born 6 February 1962) is an Argentine former professional association footballer who was part of the 1988–89 championship squad at Maccabi Haifa.

Biography

Playing career 
In 1988, Maccabi Haifa decided to bring in Jewish players from Argentina since they would qualify as immigrants and not as transfers. The Jewish Agency paid for all travel and even some living expenses for new immigrants, saving the club money. Grimberg was brought in under these circumstances, along with Fabian Lagman and Patricio Sayegh.

References

External links
  Profile and short biography of Fabian Grimberg on Maccabi Haifa's official website
  Limited profile of Fabian Grimberg on the Base de datos del futbol Argentino

1962 births
Living people
Footballers from Buenos Aires
Jewish Argentine sportspeople
Jewish Israeli sportspeople
Argentine footballers
Israeli footballers
Argentine emigrants to Israel
Club Atlético Vélez Sarsfield footballers
Aldosivi footballers
Maccabi Haifa F.C. players
Shimshon Tel Aviv F.C. players
Maccabi Ironi Ashdod F.C. players
Club Almagro players
Hapoel Tirat HaCarmel F.C. players
Maccabi Kafr Kanna F.C. players
Israeli people of Argentine-Jewish descent
Sportspeople of Argentine descent
Association football defenders